The under secretary of defense for personnel and readiness, or USD (P&R) is a high-ranking civilian position in the Office of the Secretary of Defense (OSD) within the United States Department of Defense responsible for advising the secretary and deputy secretary of defense on recruitment, career development, pay and benefits, and oversight of the state of military readiness. The under secretary is appointed from civilian life by the president and confirmed by the Senate to serve at the pleasure of the President.

Gil Cisneros is the current under secretary of defense for personnel and readiness, confirmed by the United States Senate on 11 August 2021. Additionally, he exercises day-to-day supervision of the Department of Defense Education Activity and the Defense Commissary Agency.

The previous most recent under secretary was Matthew Donovan, who served from 23 March 2020 to 20 January 2021.

Overview
The Office of the Under Secretary of Defense for Personnel and Readiness (OUSD(P&R)) is the principal staff element for the Department of Defense for all human resources, human capital development, and personnel logistics matters. The USD(P&R) has oversight of the Defense Commissary Agency, Department of Defense Education Activity, Defense Human Resources Activity, the Military Health System, and the Defense Travel Management Office. The USD(P&R) is also responsible for training, health affairs, National Guard and Reserve affairs, personnel requirements for weapons support, and military and civilian family matters, subject to the authority of the Secretary of Defense. Through the Deputy Assistant Secretary of Defense for Military Personnel Policy, the United States Military Entrance Processing Command also reports to the Under Secretary.

With the rank of Under Secretary, the USD(P&R) is a Level III position within the Executive Schedule. Since January 2010, the annual rate of pay for Level III is $165,300.

History
The position was first mandated by the National Defense Authorization Act for Fiscal Year 1994 (P.L. 103-160), signed by President Clinton on 30 November 1993. Defense Directive 5124.2, passed 17 March 1994, officially established the position, incorporating the functions of the Assistant Secretary of Defense(Force Management and Personnel) and authorizing authority over the Assistant Secretary of Defense for Reserve Affairs and the Assistant Secretary of Defense for Health Affairs. Since the National Defense Authorization Act for Fiscal Year 2000 was signed on 5 October 1999, the Under Secretary has been responsible for establishing standards on deployment of units away from assigned duty stations, the length of time they may be away for a deployment away from assigned duty stations, and for establishing systems for reporting tracking deployments.

When created in 1993, the USD(P&R) assumed authority primarily over three DoD offices: the Assistant Secretary of Defense for Health Affairs, Assistant Secretary of Defense for Reserve Affairs, and Assistant Secretary of Defense for Force Management Policy. The ASD(FMP) has since been abolished, its responsibilities assumed by other officials reporting to the USD(P&R).

Reporting officials
Officials reporting to the USD (P&R) include:
 Deputy Under Secretary of Defense for Personnel and Readiness
 Military Deputy to the Under Secretary of Defense for Personnel and Readiness
 Director, Office of Diversity Management and Equal Opportunity
 Defense Equal Opportunity Management Institute
 Director, Defense Suicide Prevention Office
 Director, Personnel Risk Reduction Office
 Assistant Secretary of Defense for Readiness
 Assistant Secretary of Defense for Health Affairs
 Military Health System
 Deputy Assistant Secretary of Defense for Wounded Warrior Care & Transition Policy
 Assistant Secretary of Defense for Manpower and Reserve Affairs
 Director, Defense Commissary Agency
 Director, Department of Defense Education Activity
 Deputy Assistant Secretary of Defense for Civilian Personnel Policy
 Deputy Assistant Secretary of Defense for Military Personnel Policy
 Deputy Assistant Secretary of Defense for Military Community and Family Policy
 Deputy Assistant Secretary of Defense for Readiness
 Director, Office of Total Force Planning & Requirements
 Director, Transition to Veterans Program Office
 Director, Defense Human Resources Activity
 Director, DoD/VA Collaboration Office

Budget

Budget totals
The annual budget for the USD (P&R) is contained in the Office of the Secretary of Defense's (OSD) budget, under the Defense-Wide Operation and Maintenance (O&M) account.

Budget features
Contracts and other Support Services - Funds contracts and other support services for mission requirements, including Intergovernmental Personnel Act requirements
Advancing Diversity and Equal Opportunity Program - Funding to increase the number of people with targeted disabilities in the federal civilian workforce to support the DoD goal of two percent DoD-wide, emphasizing the benefit for wounded service members
Assistant Secretary of Defense (Health Affairs) - ASD (HA) is the principal medical staff advisor to the Secretary of Defense and principal program manager for all DoD health matters to include medical readiness, health care delivery, preventive medicine, medical military construction, and the procurement, development, training and retention of medical military and civilian personnel
Assistant Secretary of Defense (Reserve Affairs) - Funds managed by ASD (RA) are utilized to conduct valuable research and analysis for specific topics and issues that arise related to the National Guard and military Reserve components
Combatant Commander's Exercise Engagement and Training Transformation (CE2T2) - The program was established as a result of direction from the Quadrennial Defense Review that re-aligned and consolidated joint training programs and applies resulting efficiencies against new mission areas and existing joint training shortfalls
Defense Safety Oversight Council (DSOC) - Supports safety initiatives to reduce and prevent injuries to Defense Department personnel
Defense Readiness Reporting System (DRRS) - Allows for quick analysis of force capability issues, effective program oversight, operator training, and data maintenance
Lost Work Days System - Lost Work Days aims to increase operational readiness by providing data and analysis to eliminate preventable mishaps
Military Personnel Policy (MPP) Naturalization Support - Funding to pay U.S. Citizenship and Immigration Services in the United States Department of Homeland Security to not charge fees to military members applying for naturalization to become US citizens
Military Spouse Intern Program - Assists eligible spouses of active duty military in obtaining positions in federal agencies by paying the spouses' salary and benefits for the first year of employment
Studies Program - The Department contracts for assistance in facilitating studies that improve the overall operation and efficiency of the OUSD(P&R) and the programs over which it exercises oversight
Training Transformation - Provides oversight of the Department's Joint training effort
Wounded Warrior Care and Transition Policy (WWCTP) - Funds WWCTP operations that provide OSD-level oversight of the development and implementation of comprehensive disability, non-medical care and case management, and transition programs, policies and standards Department-wide
Travel - Funds employee travel to support USD(P&R) mission

Office holders

Principal Deputy
The Principal Deputy Under Secretary of Defense for Personnel and Readiness (PDUSD(P&R)) is the Under Secretary's chief staff assistant. PDUSD (P&R) is delegated full power and authority to act for the USD(P&R) and exercise the powers of the USD(P&R) on any and all matters that the USD(P&R) is authorized to act, except in those areas where delegation of the USD(P&R) authority is otherwise restricted by higher authority or prohibited by law.

Established as the Deputy Under Secretary of Defense (Personnel and Readiness) by the National Defense Authorization Act for FY 2002 (P.L. 107-107), the post took over the duties of the Assistant Secretary of Defense for Force Management Policy, which was then abolished. The DUSD(P&R) was re-designated Principal Deputy Under Secretary of Defense (Personnel and Readiness), or PDUSD(P&R) in July 2003 by DoD Directive 5124.8. As of 2012, the position again holds the rank of Principal Deputy Under Secretary.

References